Dentzel Carousel may refer to:

Dentzel Carousel Company, American builder of carousels in Philadelphia, Pennsylvania in the late 19th and early 20th century
Highland Park Dentzel Carousel and Shelter Building, historic carousel and building in Highland Park in Meridian, Mississippi, U.S.
Spencer Park Dentzel Carousel, also known as Riverside Park Dentzel Carousel, a carousel in Riverside Park of Logansport, Indiana, U.S.
Weona Park Carousel, also known as Dentzel Stationary Menagerie Carousel, historic carousel in Pen Argyl, Northampton County, Pennsylvania, U.S.